Chuck Jackson (born March 11, 1953) is the Canadian musician, lead singer and one of two harmonica players in the Downchild Blues Band, otherwise known as Downchild, with which he has been associated since 1990.

Biography
Jackson has been a professional musician since the 1960s, and since the late 1970s primarily as a blues singer and harmonica player. Between 1978 and 1992, he was the lead singer of the well respected Cameo Blues Band, of Toronto, with whom he continues to perform on occasion. In addition to his work with Downchild, Jackson performs and has recorded with a changing group of musicians, which has included Downchild's Michael Fonfara and Pat Carey, as Chuck Jackson and The Allstars.

While Jackson was born in Toronto, for most of his life he has also lived in Port Credit, Ontario. Jackson has demonstrated a particular passion for supporting the Port Credit. In 1999, he co-founded the Southside Shuffle, an annual Port Credit-based blues and jazz festival that has grown to feature in excess of one hundred acts over three days.

Jackson has been honoured with a distinguished career award by the Toronto Blues Society, as well as Maple Blues Awards for male vocalist of the year, among other honours.

Jackson is also the half brother of Canadian comedians Mike Bullard and Pat Bullard.

Awards
 1999 Maple Blues Award, Male Vocalist of The Year
 2002 Blues With a Feeling Award, Toronto Blues Society, honouring distinguished career
 2007 Maple Blues Award, Male Vocalist of The Year

Discography

With Downchild
 1994 Good Times Guaranteed (Downchild Music)
 1997 Lucky 13 (Downchild Music)
 2004 Come On In (Downchild Music)
 2007 Live at the Palais Royale (Downchild Music)
 2009 I Need A Hat (Downchild Music)

With The Cameo Blues Band
2002 All Play and No Work (Make It Real Records)

Chuck Jackson and The Allstars
 2000 Last Night (Iridescent Music)
 2006 Comfy Cosy (Iridescent Music)

References

External links
Chuck Jackson website
 Downchild website

1953 births
Living people
Blues harmonica players
Canadian blues singers
Musicians from Toronto